Shahbulag Mosque (1751–1752) is a historical and architectural monument located in the area called Shahbulag in the Agdam region of Azerbaijan. The mosque was built by order of Panah Ali Khan in 1751–1752.

Structure
The Shahbulag Mosque is built entirely from local limestone, and consists of three arched balconies and a worship hall. The balconies are supported by a pair of stone columns. The ceiling is completed in the form of arcade. As the worship hall is square, the ceiling has the form of a dome from the interior, and on the outside the roof is made up of two slopes with the addition of new coating materials. This was created to make favorable conditions for the immediate flow of natural waters.

The total wall thickness of the mosque reaches one meter. The plan dimensions of the mosque is 9,38x7,18 meters. As the mosque is built on the sloping ground, its distance from the rear to the roof is 4.37 meters and from the front facade to 5.40 meters.

Despite the fact that the Shahbulag Mosque is architecturally simple, it is an example of architect Karbalayi Safikhan Karabakhi's creativity, seen in numerous mosques in Karabakh.

The architectural idea of the Shahbulag mosque continues in the mosque in Papravənd village of Aghdam.

See also
Shahbulag Castle

References

Monuments and memorials in Azerbaijan
Islamic architecture
Mosques in Azerbaijan